Sporobolus durus was a species of grass in the family Poaceae, found only on Ascension Island in the South Atlantic. It is extinct due to overgrazing and displacement by invasive weeds. Its date of extinction is unknown; it was last recorded in 1886 but not searched for, specifically, until 1998.

References

durus
Flora of Ascension Island
Grasses of Africa
Extinct plants
Extinct biota of Africa
Plant extinctions since 1500
Taxonomy articles created by Polbot
Taxa named by Adolphe-Théodore Brongniart